Kotaha is a village in Uttar Pradesh, India.

References

Villages in Allahabad district